The Bundestag ("Federal Diet") is the German federal parliament. It is the only federal representative body that is directly elected by the German people. It is comparable to the United States House of Representatives or the House of Commons of the United Kingdom. The Bundestag was established by Title III of the Basic Law for the Federal Republic of Germany in 1949 as one of the legislative bodies of Germany and thus it is the historical successor to the earlier Reichstag.

The members of the Bundestag are representatives of the German people as a whole, are not bound by any orders or instructions and are only accountable to their electorate. The minimum legal number of members of the Bundestag is 598; however, due to the system of overhang and leveling seats the current 20th Bundestag has a total of 736 members, making it the largest Bundestag to date and the largest freely elected national parliamentary chamber in the world.

The Bundestag is elected every four years by German citizens aged 18 or over. Elections use a mixed-member proportional representation system which combines first-past-the-post elected seats with a proportional party list to ensure its composition mirrors the national popular vote. An early election is only possible in the cases outlined in Articles 63 and 68 of the Grundgesetz.

The Bundestag has several functions. It is the chief legislative body on the federal level. The individual states (Bundesländer) of Germany participate in legislative process through the Bundesrat, a separate assembly. The Bundestag also elects and oversees the chancellor, Germany's head of government, and sets the government budget.

Since 1999, it has met in the Reichstag building in Berlin. The Bundestag also operates in multiple new government buildings in Berlin and has its own police force (the Bundestagspolizei). The current president of the Bundestag since 2021 is Bärbel Bas of the SPD. The 20th Bundestag has five vice presidents and is the most visited parliament in the world.

History

Bundestag translates as "Federal Diet", with "" (cognate to English "bundle") in this context meaning federation, and "" (day) came to mean "meeting in conference" — another example being  (similar to "diet", which is from Latin "", day).

With the dissolution of the German Confederation in 1866 and the founding of the German Empire (German Reich) in 1871, the Reichstag was established as the German parliament in Berlin, which was the capital of the then Kingdom of Prussia (the largest and most influential state in both the Confederation and the empire). Two decades later, the current parliament building was erected. The Reichstag delegates were elected by direct and equal male suffrage (and not the three-class electoral system prevailing in Prussia until 1918). The Reichstag did not participate in the appointment of the chancellor until the parliamentary reforms of October 1918. After the Revolution of November 1918 and the establishment of the Weimar Constitution, women were given the right to vote for (and serve in) the Reichstag, and the parliament could use the no-confidence vote to force the chancellor or any cabinet member to resign. In 1933, Adolf Hitler was appointed chancellor and through the Reichstag Fire Decree, the Enabling Act of 1933 and the death of President Paul von Hindenburg in 1934, gained unlimited power. After this, the Reichstag met only rarely, usually at the Kroll Opera House to unanimously rubber-stamp the decisions of the government. It last convened on 26 April 1942.

With the new constitution of 1949, the Bundestag was established as the new West German parliament. Because West Berlin was not officially under the jurisdiction of the constitution, a legacy of the Cold War, the Bundestag met in Bonn in several different buildings, including (provisionally) a former waterworks facility. In addition, owing to the city's legal status, citizens of West Berlin were unable to vote in elections to the Bundestag, and were instead represented by 22 non-voting delegates chosen by the House of Representatives, the city's legislature. 

The Bundeshaus in Bonn is the former parliament building of Germany. The sessions of the German Bundestag were held there from 1949 until its move to Berlin in 1999. Today it houses the International Congress Centre Bundeshaus Bonn and in the northern areas the branch office of the Bundesrat ("Federal Council"), which represents the  – the federated states. The southern areas became part of German offices for the United Nations in 2008.

The former Reichstag building housed a history exhibition and served occasionally as a conference center. The Reichstag building was also occasionally used as a venue for sittings of the Bundestag and its committees and the Federal Convention, the body which elects the German federal president. However, the Soviets harshly protested against the use of the Reichstag building by institutions of the Federal Republic of Germany and tried to disturb the sittings by flying supersonic jets close to the building.

Since 19 April 1999, the German parliament has again assembled in Berlin in its original Reichstag building, which was built in 1888 based on the plans of German architect Paul Wallot and underwent a significant renovation under the lead of British architect Lord Norman Foster.

In 2005, a small aircraft crashed close to the German Parliament. It was then decided to ban private air traffic over Central Berlin.

Tasks
Together with the Bundesrat, the Bundestag is the legislative branch of the German political system.

Although most legislation is initiated by the executive branch, the Bundestag considers the legislative function its most important responsibility, concentrating much of its energy on assessing and amending the government's legislative program. The committees (see below) play a prominent role in this process. Plenary sessions provide a forum for members to engage in public debate on legislative issues before them, but they tend to be well attended only when significant legislation is being considered.

The Bundestag members are the only federal officials directly elected by the public; the Bundestag in turn elects the chancellor and, in addition, exercises oversight of the executive branch on issues of both substantive policy and routine administration. This check on executive power can be employed through binding legislation, public debates on government policy, investigations, and direct questioning of the chancellor or cabinet officials. For example, the Bundestag can conduct a question hour, in which a government representative responds to a written question previously submitted by a member. Members can ask related questions during the question hour. The questions can concern anything from a major policy issue to a specific constituent's problem. Use of the question hour has increased markedly over the past forty years, with more than 20,000 questions being posed during the 1987–90 term. The opposition parties actively exercise their parliamentary right to scrutinize government actions.

Constituent services also take place via the Petition Committee. In 2004, the Petition Committee received over 18,000 complaints from citizens and was able to negotiate a mutually satisfactory solution to more than half of them. In 2005, as a pilot of the potential of internet petitions, a version of e-petitioner was produced for the Bundestag. This was a collaborative project involving The Scottish Parliament, International Teledemocracy Centre and the Bundestag 'Online Services Department'. The system was formally launched on 1 September 2005, and in 2008 the Bundestag moved to a new system based on its evaluation.

Electoral term 

The Bundestag is elected for four years, and new elections must be held between 46 and 48 months after the beginning of its electoral term, unless the Bundestag is dissolved prematurely. Its term ends when the next Bundestag convenes, which must occur within 30 days of the election. Prior to 1976, there could be a period where one Bundestag had been dissolved and the next Bundestag could not be convened; during this period, the rights of the Bundestag were exercised by a so-called "Permanent Committee".

Election
 Germany uses the mixed-member proportional representation system, a system of proportional representation combined with elements of first-past-the-post voting. The Bundestag has 598 nominal members, elected for a four-year term; these seats are distributed between the sixteen German states in proportion to the states' population eligible to vote.

Every elector has two votes: a constituency vote (first vote) and a party list vote (second vote). Based solely on the first votes, 299 members are elected in single-member constituencies by first-past-the-post voting. The second votes are used to produce a proportional number of seats for parties, first in the states, and then on the federal level. Seats are allocated using the Sainte-Laguë method. If a party wins fewer constituency seats in a state than its second votes would entitle it to, it receives additional seats from the relevant state list. Parties can file lists in every single state under certain conditions – for example, a fixed number of supporting signatures. Parties can receive second votes only in those states in which they have filed a state list.

If a party, by winning single-member constituencies in one state, receives more seats than it would be entitled to according to its second vote share in that state (so-called overhang seats), the other parties receive compensation seats. Owing to this provision, the Bundestag usually has more than 598 members. The 20th and current Bundestag, for example, has 736 seats: 598 regular seats and 138 overhang and compensation seats. Overhang seats are calculated at the state level, so many more seats are added to balance this out among the different states, adding more seats than would be needed to compensate for overhang at the national level in order to avoid negative vote weight.

To qualify for seats based on the party-list vote share, a party must either win three single-member constituencies via first votes (basic mandate clause) or exceed a threshold of 5% of the second votes nationwide. If a party only wins one or two single-member constituencies and fails to get at least 5% of the second votes, it keeps the single-member seat(s), but other parties that accomplish at least one of the two threshold conditions receive compensation seats. In the most recent example of this, during the 2002 election, the PDS won only 4.0% of the second votes nationwide, but won two constituencies in the state of Berlin. The same applies if an independent candidate wins a single-member constituency, which has not happened since the 1949 election.

If a voter cast a first vote for a successful independent candidate or a successful candidate whose party failed to qualify for proportional representation, their second vote does not count toward proportional representation. However, it does count toward whether the elected party exceeds the 5% threshold.

Parties representing recognized national minorities (currently Danes, Frisians, Sorbs, and Romani people) are exempt from both the 5% threshold and the basic mandate clause, but normally only run in state elections. The only party that has been able to benefit from this provision so far on the federal level is the South Schleswig Voters' Association, which represents the minorities of Danes and Frisians in Schleswig-Holstein and managed to win a seat in 1949 and 2021.

Latest election result
The latest federal election was held on Sunday, 26 September 2021, to elect the members of the 20th Bundestag.

List of Bundestag by session

Presidents since 1949

Membership

Organization

Parliamentary groups
The most important organisational structures within the Bundestag are parliamentary groups (Fraktionen; sing. Fraktion). A parliamentary group must consist of at least 5% of all members of parliament. Members of parliament from different parties may only join in a group if those parties did not run against each other in any German state during the election. Normally, all parties that surpassed the 5%-threshold build a parliamentary group. The CDU and CSU have always formed a single united Fraktion (CDU/CSU), which is possible, as the CSU only runs in the state of Bavaria and the CDU only runs in the other 15 states. The size of a party's Fraktion determines the extent of its representation on committees, the time slots allotted for speaking, the number of committee chairs it can hold, and its representation in executive bodies of the Bundestag. The Fraktionen, not the members, receive the bulk of government funding for legislative and administrative activities.

The leadership of each Fraktion consists of a parliamentary party leader, several deputy leaders, and an executive committee. The leadership's major responsibilities are to represent the Fraktion, enforce party discipline and orchestrate the party's parliamentary activities. The members of each Fraktion are distributed among working groups focused on specific policy-related topics such as social policy, economics, and foreign policy. The Fraktion meets every Tuesday afternoon in the weeks in which the Bundestag is in session to consider legislation before the Bundestag and formulate the party's position on it.

Parties that do not hold 5% of the Bundestag-seats may be granted the status of a Gruppe (literally "group", but a different status from Fraktion) in the Bundestag; this is decided case by case, as the rules of procedure do not state a fixed number of seats for this. Most recently, this applied to the Party of Democratic Socialism (PDS) from 1990 to 1998. This status entails some privileges which are in general less than those of a Fraktion.

Executive bodies
The Bundestag's executive bodies include the Council of Elders and the Presidium. The council consists of the Bundestag leadership, together with the most senior representatives of each Fraktion, with the number of these representatives tied to the strength of the Parliamentary groups in the chamber. The council is the coordination hub, determining the daily legislative agenda and assigning committee chairpersons based on Parliamentary group representation. The council also serves as an important forum for interparty negotiations on specific legislation and procedural issues. The Presidium is responsible for the routine administration of the Bundestag, including its clerical and research activities. It consists of the chamber's president (usually elected from the largest Fraktion) and vice presidents (one from each Fraktion).

Committees
Most of the legislative work in the Bundestag is the product of standing committees, which exist largely unchanged throughout one legislative period. The number of committees approximates the number of federal ministries, and the titles of each are roughly similar (e.g., defense, agriculture, and labor). There are, as of the current nineteenth Bundestag, 24 standing committees. The distribution of committee chairs and the membership of each committee reflect the relative strength of the various Parliamentary groups in the chamber. In the current nineteenth Bundestag, the CDU/CSU chaired ten committees, the SPD five, the AfD and the FDP three each, The Left and the Greens two each. Members of the opposition party can chair a significant number of standing committees (e.g. the budget committee is by tradition chaired by the biggest opposition party). These committees have either a small staff or no staff at all.

Administration 
The members of Bundestag and the presidium are supported by the Bundestag Administration. It is headed by the Director, that reports to the President of the Bundestag. 
The Bundestag Administrations four departments are Parliament Service, Research, Information / Documentation and Central Affairs. 
The Bundestag Administration employs around 3,000 employees.

Principle of discontinuation
As is the case with some other parliaments, the Bundestag is subject to the principle of discontinuation, meaning that a newly elected Bundestag is legally regarded to be a body and entity completely different from the previous Bundestag. This leads to the result that any motion, application or action submitted to the previous Bundestag, e.g. a bill referred to the Bundestag by the Federal Government, is regarded as void by non-decision (German terminology: "Die Sache fällt der Diskontinuität anheim"). Thus any bill that has not been decided upon by the beginning of the new electoral period must be brought up by the government again if it aims to uphold the motion, this procedure in effect delaying the passage of the bill. Furthermore, any newly elected Bundestag will have to freshly decide on the rules of procedure (Geschäftsordnung), which is done by a formal decision of taking over such rules from the preceding Bundestag by reference.

Any Bundestag (even after a snap election) is considered dissolved only once a newly elected Bundestag has actually gathered in order to constitute itself (Article 39 sec. 1 sentence 2 of the Basic Law), which has to happen within 30 days of its election (Article 39 sec. 2 of the Basic Law). Thus, it may happen (and has happened) that the old Bundestag gathers and makes decisions even after the election of a new Bundestag that has not gathered in order to constitute itself. For example, elections to the 16th Bundestag took place on 18 September 2005, but the 15th Bundestag still convened after election day to make some decisions on German military engagement abroad, and was entitled to do so, as the newly elected 16th Bundestag did not convene for the first time until 18 October 2005.

See also
 German governing coalition
 Parliamentwatch

References
Informational notes

Citations

External links

 
 German election database
 Map of constituencies
 Distribution of power
 Plenary speech search engine

 
Germany
Germany